Lloyd James may refer to:

Lloyd James (cricketer) (1937–2019), Bermudian cricketer
Lloyd James (footballer) (born 1988), Welsh professional footballer
King Jammy, Lloyd James (born 1947), Jamaican dub mixer and record producer

See also 
 Arthur Lloyd James, Welsh phonetician
 James Lloyd (disambiguation)